The Teaching Museum North is located in Roswell, Georgia, USA. The museum offers participatory educational programs and exhibits for primary and secondary school children in the Fulton County School System as well as students from other schools.

History
The Fulton County Public Schools Foundation, Inc. established two teaching museums in the spring of 1991. Teaching Museum North is located in the former Roswell Elementary site on Mimosa Boulevard. Teaching Museum South, located at North Avenue Elementary in Hapeville, is the South Fulton County site.

External links
 

Roswell, Georgia
Museums established in 1991
Children's museums in Georgia (U.S. state)
History museums in Georgia (U.S. state)
Museums in Fulton County, Georgia
1991 establishments in Georgia (U.S. state)